The National Stadium  (also named 龍騰體育場), formerly known as the World Games Stadium, is a multi-purpose stadium in Zuoying District, Kaohsiung, Taiwan. It is currently the largest stadium in Taiwan in terms of capacity.

Completed in 2009, it is used mostly for football matches and it hosted the main events for the 2009 World Games. The stadium has a capacity of 55,000 people. Since the conclusion of the games, the stadium has been used for some Taiwanese football team matches.

The stadium, designed by Japanese architect Toyo Ito, makes use of solar energy to provide its power needs. The stadium's semi spiral-shaped, like a dragon, is the first stadium in the world to provide power using solar power technology. The solar panels covering the vast external face of the stadium are able to generate most of the power required for its own operation, as well as additional power that can be saved.

Transportation
The stadium is accessible within walking distance West from World Games Station of the Kaohsiung MRT.

Events

Concerts

Gallery

See also
 List of stadiums in Taiwan

References

External links
Official website

Football venues in Taiwan
Athletics (track and field) venues in Taiwan
Multi-purpose stadiums in Taiwan
Sports venues completed in 2009
Toyo Ito buildings
Sports venues in Kaohsiung
2009 establishments in Taiwan
Futurist architecture
Postmodern architecture in Taiwan